Altica chalybea (grape flea beetle) is a leaf beetle which consumes the buds of grape vines, reducing vegetative growth.

Appearance
The grape flea beetle is a small bluish-green beetle. Like many Chrysomelids, it has a reflective appearance, hence its other name, the "grape steely beetle."

References

Alticini
Beetles of North America
Agricultural pest insects
Beetles described in 1807
Taxa named by Johann Karl Wilhelm Illiger